The World Figure Skating Championships is an annual figure skating competition sanctioned by the International Skating Union in which figure skaters compete for the title of World Champion.

Men's competitions took from place February 18 to 19 in Zürich, Switzerland. Ladies' and pairs' competitions took place from February 11 to 12 in Stockholm, Sweden.

Results

Men

Judges:
 Kurt Dannenberg 
 Hans Günauer 
 H. Martineau 
 Charles Sabouret 
 A. Steinmann

Ladies

Judges:
 A. Anderberg 
 Otto Bohatsch 
 B. Börjeson 
 Walter Jakobsson 
 C. L. Wilson

Pairs

Judges:
 Otto Bohatsch 
 B. Börjeson 
 Herbert J. Clarke 
 Tore Monthander 
 Andor Szende

Sources
 Result List provided by the ISU

World Figure Skating Championships
World Figure Skating Championships
World Figure Skating Championships
World Figure Skating Championships
International figure skating competitions hosted by Sweden
International figure skating competitions hosted by Switzerland
February 1933 sports events
20th century in Zürich
1930s in Stockholm
International sports competitions in Stockholm